The Raid on Nassau was a Spanish military expedition that took place in February 1720 during the War of the Quadruple Alliance wherein Spanish forces assaulted the British settlement of Nassau in an attempt to seize the island of New Providence. Although the Spanish managed to raid outlying posts, the assault on Nassau itself was repelled and the invasion was a failure.

Background
In 1718, the British Empire sought to establish control of the Bahamas which was dominated by piracy. To this end, it appointed Captain Woodes Rogers as royal governor. He successfully suppressed pirates, reformed the civil administration and restored trade.

In February, 1719 Rogers had received news that the Spanish intended to invade and conquer the Bahamas. The Spanish fleet was delayed however, as it was diverted to Florida in order to recapture Pensacola from the French in August, 1719. Rogers would further consolidate his position during this time with the reconstruction of Fort Nassau, which was completed in January 1720.

By then, in the Caribbean there was armed aggression between British and Spanish ships due to the clandestine trade of the former; this increased with the outbreak of the War of the Quadruple Alliance. The governor of Cuba, Gregorio Guazo, seeing how Rogers continued to colonise the Bahamas, organised a military force to capture Nassau.

Three Spanish frigates of the Armada de Barlovento were to form the backbone of the fleet under the command of Francisco Cornejo. This naval element was further bolstered by nine privateer vessels including brigantines and sloops. The land forces consisted of approximately 1,300–2,000 men with a range of military experience, as well as 1,400 regular soldiers.

Raid
At the end of February, 1720, the Spaniards from Havana delivered their long delayed attack upon New Providence and sailed through the Florida Straits to reach the island. Rogers had at his disposal Old Fort of Nassau with fifty guns and a ten gun eastern battery. In addition he had  around a hundred soldiers and nearly 500 local militia men many of whom were ex pirates. Rogers also had two ships – the Delicia of 32-guns and the frigate HMS Flamborough of 24-guns under Captain Johnathan Hildesley.

The Spanish sailed to attack New Providence from the north – the two large warships Principle and Hercules sat out in the deeper water where they anchored themselves. On February 24 Cornejo in the San Jose of 36-guns with the smaller warships including the San Cristoforo of 20-guns and eight sloops unfurled their Spanish colours off Nassau harbour. The Spanish appearance in Nassau caught the British by surprise, but Cornejo, however, did not directly attack the port due to the presence of Delicia and Flamborough. Rogers nevertheless had to browbeat Hildesley of the latter to stay and defend the island. Cornejo waited for the next day to attack but high winds the following morning turned into a storm in the afternoon, which forced the Spanish to cut their cables, and Cornejo had to head for the open sea.

The Spanish frigate and the sloops made another attempt, this time to avoid the heavy defences of Fort Nassau. They cruised along Hog Island which sheltered the city's harbour, to the east and west in order to block the entrance.  On the night of 25 February the Spaniards attempted to land three columns on the backside of Hog island and cross the narrow eastern channel in small boats. Quietly they rowed toward the shore but they were met with musket and cannon fire. The Spanish in the boats realised that surprise was lost; in confusion and panic they fell back, disembarked and then rowed hard to get out of range. According to the Flamborough'''s log book, just two black (possibly ex-slaves) sentries in a small redoubt repelled this Spanish force. To the west the Spanish made an attempt to land where 500 militia, mostly ex-pirates, waited. After causing some considerable damage to outlying property this attack was also repelled which eventually degenerated into a minor skirmish until the Spanish again withdrew.

Later that day another storm hit the Spaniards which eventually forced their withdrawal; the San Cristoforo'' was found by militia to be wrecked on the Bahama Banks. By 1 March the Spanish had arrived back in Havana which thus ended the threat of invasion.

Aftermath
After the Spaniards had been repelled, Rogers was unaware of their withdrawal and it was not until several weeks later that he received a letter from two Englishmen in Havana who had been informed that the Spanish fleet had been hit by a storm which forced their withdrawal. Cornejo having returned to Havana had the consolation of having captured over a hundred slaves and considerable booty.

Despite repelling the Spanish, throughout the rest of the year Rogers had been unable to pay the garrison. With his health failing, he set sail for Charleston on 6 December 1720. The governor had expended his personal fortune on Nassau's defenses. Troubled by the lack of support and communication from London, Rogers set sail for Britain in March 1721. He arrived three months later to find that a new governor had been appointed. Personally liable for the obligations he had contracted at Nassau, he was imprisoned for debt.

Pezuela's account of events
Jacabo Pezuela, a Spanish historian, tells a completely different tale of events. He does not mention the presence of British ships in the area and says that Cornejo attacked the fort with the fleet, while Cordero, with several companies, occupied Nassau, and that the men of the fort surrendered after three days. Pezuela also states that Rogers had travelled to Bermuda when Cornejo appeared in Nassau. Pezuela says that after the surrender of the fort, 200 men were evacuated with the condition of being transferred to Bermuda. He also says that while the Spanish assault was a success, since the settlers were repulsed into the countryside and the artillery of the fort, 100 slaves and other things were captured, that did not offset the raid expenses.

Notes

References

Bibliography

External links
 

Battles involving Great Britain
Battles involving Spain
Battles of the War of the Quadruple Alliance
Conflicts in 1720
Wars involving the Bahamas
1720 in the Bahamas
Amphibious operations involving Spain